The 2015 Eschborn-Frankfurt City Loop was scheduled to be the 54th edition of the Eschborn-Frankfurt City Loop semi-classic cycling race; it would have taken place on 1 May 2015. The race was cancelled the day before it was scheduled to take place because of a suspected terrorist plot similar to the Boston Marathon bombing.

Planned event 
The race was to have taken place on 1 May 2015 and was rated as a 1.HC event by the Union Cycliste Internationale (UCI). The defending champion was Alexander Kristoff. The favourites for victory included Kristoff and John Degenkolb, who had between them won Milan–San Remo, the Tour of Flanders and Paris–Roubaix.

Teams 
22 teams were invited to take part in the race. Six of these were UCI WorldTeams; seven were UCI Professional Continental teams; eight were German UCI Continental teams; the last was a German national team.

Suspected terrorist plot and cancellation 
On 30 April 2015, the day before the race was due to have taken place, local authorities announced that it had been cancelled due to "indications of a possible threat to the population". A couple, one of whom was described as a "suspected Islamic extremist", were arrested the previous day at their home in Oberursel, which is along the race route. The couple arrested were identified as Halil D., 35, a German citizen of Turkish origin, and Senay D., 34, thought to be a Turkish citizen.

Various items were found in their house, including a homemade pipe bomb, bomb-making materials, an automatic rifle, bazooka ammunition and a canister full of petrol. One of the couple had apparently bought hydrogen peroxide and alcohol at a hardware shop and had been seen exploring a forest along the race route. He had connections to Salafists in Frankfurt, including the group Dawa FFM. The German newspaper Die Welt suggested that he was involved with Al-Qaeda, specifically Al-Qaeda in the Islamic Maghreb (AQIM). According to German police the couple had also travelled to Spain to meet with members of Sharia4Spain. It has also been suggested that there may have been connections to Adem Yilmaz, one of those convicted as part of a bomb plot in 2007.

Security officials suggested that the couple may have been planning an attack similar to the Boston Marathon bombing in 2013. Halil D. was sentenced to two and a half years in prison in July 2016 for possession of illegal weapons and falsification of documents.

References

External links 
 

2015 in German sport
2015 UCI Europe Tour
2015
Cancelled sports events
Failed terrorist attempts in Germany
Islamic terrorism in Germany
Islamic terrorist incidents in 2015
Politics and sports
2015 crimes in Germany